Varano de' Melegari is a comune (municipality) in the Province of Parma in the Italian region Emilia-Romagna, located about  west of Bologna and about  southwest of Parma.

The town is home to a medieval castle (Castello Pallavicino), a motorsport circuit, the Autodromo Riccardo Paletti, and the headquarters of racecar manufacturer Dallara. Also notable is the 7th century octagonal baptistery in the frazione of Serravalle Ceno, located on the Ceno River.

Near the town is located the Mount Prinzera, 724 meters high, it is a regional natural park along the Via Francigena, mainly formed by rocks of ophiolite origin.

References

Cities and towns in Emilia-Romagna